Žubina is a small village in the Municipality of Trebnje in eastern Slovenia. It lies north of Veliki Gaber. The area is part of the historical Lower Carniola region. The municipality is now included in the Southeast Slovenia Statistical Region.

The local church is dedicated to the Holy Spirit and belongs to the Parish of Veliki Gaber. It has a 15th-century nave that was extended and vaulted in the 18th century when the current belfry was also built.

References

External links
Žubina at Geopedia

Populated places in the Municipality of Trebnje